The First United Presbyterian Church in Sterling, Colorado is a historic church at 130 S. 4th Street.  Its present building was built in 1919 and was added to the National Register in 1982.

It has a monumental two-story portico with four fluted, Ionic columns.  The portico is flanked by engaged brick pilasters and is topped by a cornice-boxed pediment.

References

Presbyterian churches in Colorado
Churches on the National Register of Historic Places in Colorado
Neoclassical architecture in Colorado
Churches completed in 1919
Buildings and structures in Sterling, Colorado
National Register of Historic Places in Logan County, Colorado
Churches in Logan County, Colorado
Neoclassical church buildings in the United States